Joseph A. Baker (born 1959) is a Republican politician who was elected to and serves in the Vermont House of Representatives. He represents the Rutland-1-2 Representative District.

References

1959 births
Living people
Republican Party members of the Vermont House of Representatives
Place of birth missing (living people)